Eberhard Zorn (born February 19, 1960) is a German general who serves as the 16th and incumbent Inspector General of the Bundeswehr, the German Armed Forces.

Background

 
Born on February 19, 1960, in Saarbrücken, West Germany, he entered the military in 1978 at the Artillery School in Idar-Oberstein, trained as an artillery officer and completed his artillery officer training and course of study in economics and organizational sciences at the Bundeswehr University Munich from 1979 to 1983.

Promoted to 1st lieutenant, he was assigned as platoon leader and intelligence officer (S 2), Observation Battalion 103 (Beobachtungsbataillon 103) in Pfullendorf from 1983 to 1987, and became commander of the 3rd Battery, Observation Battalion 123, from 1987 to 1990, promoted as captain, and commander of the fire control and operations and training officer (S 3), Headquarters Artillery Regiment 12, from 1990 to 1991 both in Tauberbischofsheim.

He entered the 34th General Staff Officer Course at the Bundeswehr Command and Staff College in Hamburg from 1991 to 1993 and attended the French General Staff Officer Course (CSEM/CID) in Paris, France, in 1993–1995.

He was assigned in KLK/4th Division in Regensburg as G4 and chief of Materiel Management Section;
Deployment abroad as ACOS logistics (G 4); German Army Contingent UNPF/GECONIFOR(L); 1st Contingent, TROGIR
operations and training staff officer (G 3) and chief of Administrative
Control Section.

In 1997–1999, he was assigned in the operations and personnel staff officer (G 1 Op), German Army Forces Command in Koblenz, became commander, Field Artillery/ Armored Artillery Battalion 295 (Feld- und Panzerartilleriebataillon 295) in Immendingen in 1997–2001, promoted as lieutenant colonel, became assistant chief of branch at the Federal Ministry of Defense, Personnel, Social Services and Central Affairs (PSZ IV 4) Directorate in 2001–2002 and assistant chief of branch personnel, PSZ I 4 in Bonn. He became branch chief plans/operations/organization (G 3) at HQ German Army Forces Command, ACOS Plans/Operations/Organization (G 3) at German Army Forces Command in Koblenz from 2004 to 2007 perspectively, became branch chief Army Staff I 1 (personnel policy matters/leadership development and civic education), in the Ministry of Defence in 2007–2009, and became branch chief Army Staff Z (Central Tasks), Federal Ministry of Defense in Bonn 2009–2010.

He became commander of 26th Airborne Brigade of the Rapid Forces Division in Saarlouis from 2010 to 2012, and was promoted as brigadier general. He also served as the head of personal staff to Chief of Defence in Berlin in 2012–2014, became the commander of the Rapid Response Forces Division (DSK) in 2014–2015, and was promoted as major general. He became director forces policy, Ministry of Defence, and director-general for personnel, Ministry of Defence in Berlin in 2017–2018 promoted to lieutenant general, before becoming the Inspector General of the Bundeswehr and promoted to general since April 19, 2018.

Effective dates of promotion

Awards
  – Gold Cross of Honour
  – Silver Cross of Honour
  – Bronze Cross of Honour
  – Armed Forces Deployment Medal, IFOR
  – Armed Forces Deployment Medal, SFOR
  – German Sports Badge
  – German rescue swimming badge
  – United Nations Medal for UNPROFOR
  – NATO medal for the former Yugoslavia
  – Officier, Legion of Honour 
  – National Defence Medal, clasp: 'Corps Européen' (France)
  – National Defence Medal, clasp: 'Artillerie' (France)
  – Commander, Order of Merit of the Grand Duchy of Luxembourg
  – Commander, Order of Orange-Nassau
  – Cross for the Four Day Marches (Netherlands)
 US Parachutist Badge
 German Silver Parachutist Badge

References

External links
German Federal Ministry of Defence website (Accessed 28 July 2019)
NATO website (Accessed 28 July 2019)

1960 births
Living people
Inspectors General of the Bundeswehr
Generals of the German Army
NATO military personnel
People from Saarbrücken
Military personnel from Saarland
Recipients of the Badge of Honour of the Bundeswehr
Officiers of the Légion d'honneur
Commanders of the Order of Orange-Nassau
Commanders of the Order of Merit of the Grand Duchy of Luxembourg